Makaryata is a rural locality (a village) in Kishertskoye Rural Settlement, Kishertsky District, Perm Krai, Russia. The population was 70 as of 2010.

Geography 
Makaryata is located 12 km southeast of Ust-Kishert (the district's administrative centre) by road. Sergino is the nearest rural locality.

References 

Rural localities in Kishertsky District